Lars Ove Strømø (born 7 May 1963) is a Norwegian long-distance runner. He competed in the men's 5000 metres at the 1988 Summer Olympics.

References

1963 births
Living people
Athletes (track and field) at the 1988 Summer Olympics
Norwegian male long-distance runners
Olympic athletes of Norway
Place of birth missing (living people)